Mumbai Se Aaya Mera Dost is a 2003 Indian Hindi-language drama film starring Abhishek Bachchan, Lara Dutta and Chunky Pandey. The film is directed by Apoorva Lakhia. The film touched on the subject of the influence of television on village life. This is the first film in which Abhishek Bachchan did not keep a clean shaven look, which proved popular with audiences.

Synopsis
Dinanath Singh (Snehal Lakhia) is honored by the Indian Government, which is televised live. While receiving the honors, Dinanath informs the Government that his village is still without electricity, and he is promised that electricity will be provided in his village immediately. And electricity is provided in the village. Dinanath's grandson, Karan "Kanji" (Abhishek Bachchan), who is in Mumbai, hears of this and returns to the village along with a C-Band ten foot satellite dish and a super flat stereo television. When the satellite is set up, the villagers are thrilled by the TV shows. This helps create a running gag of copying TV culture into the rural lives. The changes lead to the village priest (Akhilendra Mishra) complaining to Chotey Thakur Rudra Pratap Singh (Yashpal Sharma) that the villagers are turning away from his temple and worship. Rudra is not concerned as he himself has a TV set in his home. But when the priest informs Rudra that his sister, Kesar Pratap Singh aka Kesi (Lara Dutta) and Kanji are in love, Rudra makes a threat to destroy Kanji and all of the village in the presence of a TV crew filming the whole drama and telecasting it live worldwide. The plot comes to a culmination when, angered by Kanji's antics, Rudra arrives to destroy the village. The villagers stand up to the exploitation and fight Rudra and his goons.

Cast
Abhishek Bachchan as Karan "Kanji" Singh
Lara Dutta as Kesar "Kesi" Pratap Singh
Chunky Pandey as Sanjay "Sanju" Singh
Aditya Lakhia as Surya
Yashpal Sharma as Chotey Thakur Rudra Pratap Singh
Rajendra Gupta as Sameer Goswami
Daya Shankar Pandey as Hari Malhotra
Akhilendra Mishra as Priest
Amitabh Bachchan as Narrator
Raageshwari as Reporter Priya
Snehal Lakhia as Grandfather
Ajay Khamosh as Guru
Shubro Bhattacharaya as Abdul
Aahi Khan as Binti
Bhagwati Singh as Gulaboo
Akbar Naqvi as Bhima
Narender Kumar as Gora
Sonal Choksi as Salma
Divya Sharma as Priest's wife
Ritu Vij as Thakur's wife
Tan Singh as Postman
Deepash Nihalani as Cameraman
Shawn Aranha as Boomman
Nihal as Adi
Vishal Nihalani as Vicky
Amul Mhatre as Police Inspector
Kapil Sharma as Kanji's Father
Shruti Gupta as Kesi's friend
Ritu Singh as Kesi's friend
Mr. Malhotra as Minister
Mrs. Meera Lakhia as Minister's Aide
Laxmi Singh as Gypsy woman
Eashak Khan as Lalu
Latif Khan as Salim
Nihal Khan as Karim
Santosh Bhopa as Rasili
Jaana as Parwati
Sua Satan as Manju
Mr. Vyas as Police
Kiran Shinde as Massage man
Alam Khan as Thakur's cousin
Razak Khan as Thakur's cousin
Babloo Ramesh as Thakur's cousin
Imran Khan as Thakur's cousin
Nabab Ali Nababuddin as Thakur's cousin 
Eashan as Thakur's cousin
Ramjan Khan as Thakur's cousin

Soundtracks
The music was created by Anu Malik. The music response for this movie was very good and some of the songs like  "Shaher Ka Jadoo Re" topped some of the Bollywood music charts.

External links
https://m.youtube.com/watch?v=PnKbKmQv3E4&feature=youtu.be on YouTube 

2000s Hindi-language films
2003 films
Mumbai in fiction
Films scored by Anu Malik
Films about television
Films scored by Ranjit Barot
Films directed by Apoorva Lakhia